Adamkayalar (literally "man-rocks") is a location in Mersin Province, Turkey famous for rock carved figures.

Geography 

Kızkalesi is on the Datça-Mersin highway. But the last  of the path which detaches from the village road, leads to a gorge named Şeytanderesi. The rest of the road is impassable by the motor vehicles and in order to reach the rocks the explorers should climb down.

Figures 

On the rocks facing the gorge, there are carved figures in nine niches. These are the figures of eleven males, four females and two children and one ibex. (The name Adamkayalar means Men-rocks) On pediment, there are also the figures of Roman eagles (Aquila). No document exists about the origin of the figures, but they are probably from the second century AD.

In 2019, a large amount of damage was inflicted on the reliefs; reports said it had been done by treasure hunters who believed gold was inside the statues.

References 

2nd-century Roman sculptures
Roman sites in Turkey
Rock reliefs in Turkey
Archaeological sites in Mersin Province, Turkey
Olba territorium